Rhacophyllites is an extinct genus of cephalopods belonging to the family Discophyllitidae. These nektonic carnivores lived during the Triassic period, from Carnian to Rhaetian age.

Species
 Rhacophyllites debilis Hauer, 1846
 Rhacophyllites kavasensis Kovacs, 1942

Description
They have a discoidal, generally evolute shell. The first lateral saddle of the suture is diphyllic and adjacent lateral saddles are diphyllic or triphillic.

References

 Siemon Wm. Muller Genotype of the Ammonite Genus Rhacophyllites Journal of Paleontology Vol. 13, No. 5 (Sep., 1939), pp. 533–537

Triassic ammonites
Ammonitida genera
Phylloceratina
Ammonites of Europe